Bangladeshi football champions mean those that won the highest league in Bangladesh football, which since 2007–08 is the Bangladesh Premier League. Before that a national championship was held from 2000 to 2005–06. Before 2000 the Dhaka League was considered the strongest league in Bangladesh.

Champions
National Championship

Bangladesh Premier League:

Total wins

See also
Bangladesh Football Federation
Federation Cup
Super Cup
Dhaka Derby

References

External links
Champions at RSSSF

Football competitions in Bangladesh
Ban